Birna Vas is a settlement in the Municipality of Sevnica in central Slovenia. It lies on the road from Krmelj to Šentjanž in the historical region of Lower Carniola. The municipality is included in the Lower Sava Statistical Region.

Name
Birna Vas was attested in written sources as Berendorf in 1455 and Werendarff in 1463, among other spellings.

References

External links
Birna Vas at Geopedia

Populated places in the Municipality of Sevnica